The 1868 Indiana gubernatorial election was held on October 13, 1868. Incumbent Republican Conrad Baker defeated Democratic nominee Thomas A. Hendricks with 50.14% of the vote.

General election

Candidates
Conrad Baker, Republican, former Lieutenant Governor under Oliver P. Morton
Thomas A. Hendricks, Democratic, U.S. Senator

Results

References

1868
Indiana
Gubernatorial